Zurich Art Prize is a Swiss art prize that has been awarded annually by the Museum Haus Konstruktiv together with the Zurich Insurance Group, since 2007. 

The award includes a cash prize (roughly $100,000 USD), and a solo exhibition in a museum. Every year, Museum Haus Konstruktiv invites six curators, critics and art experts to nominate an artist for the award and from these selected nominees a jury selects the winner.

Previous winners 
 2007: Carsten Nicolai (born 1965 in Chemnitz)
 2009: Tino Sehgal (born 1976 in London)
 2010: Ryan Gander (born 1976 in London)
 2011: Mai-Thu Perret (born 1976 in Geneva)
 2012: Mariana Castillo Deball (born 1975 in Mexico)
 2013: Adrián Villar Rojas (born 1980 in Rosario)
 2014: Haroon Mirza (born 1977 in London)
 2015: Latifa Echakhch (born 1974 in El Khnansa, Morocco, lives in Martigny)
 2016: Nairy Baghramian (born 1971 in Isfahan, Iran, lives in Berlin)
 2017: Marguerite Humeau (born 1986 in Cholet, France, lives in London)
 2018: Robin Rhode (born 1976 in Cape Town, lives in Berlin)
 2019: Leonor Antunes (born 1972 in Lisbon, lives in Berlin)
 2020: Amalia Pica (born 1978 in Neuquén, Argentina, lives in London)
 2021: Sonia Kacem (born 1985 in Geneva, lives in Amsterdam) 
 2022: Kapwani Kiwanga (born 1978 in Hamilton, Ontario, Canada, lives in Paris, France)

References 

Awards established in 2007
Swiss awards